Tolmie is a surname of Scottish origin.

People
 Donald Tolmie (1923–2009), Canadian politician
 Fraser Tolmie, 21st-century Canadian politician
 Frances Tolmie (1840–1926), Scottish folklorist from Isle of Skye
 J. C. Tolmie (James Craig Tolmie, 1862–1938), Canadian politician and military chaplain
 James Tolmie (Canadian politician) (1855–1917), politician in British Columbia, Canada
 James Tolmie (Australian politician) (1862–1939), Queensland newspaper owner and politician
 Jim Tolmie (born 1960), Scottish footballer who played for Manchester
 John Tolmie (1845–1916), Canadian politician 
 Julia Tolmie, 21st-century New Zealand legal academic
 Simon Fraser Tolmie, son of William Fraser Tolmie and 21st Premier of British Columbia
 William Fraser Tolmie (1812–1886), Hudson's Bay Company officer and British Columbia politician
 William Tolmie (politician) (1833–1875), Scots-born New Zealand politician

Places

Australia
Tolmie, Victoria, a small rural town in central Victoria

Canada
Mount Tolmie, a hill and adjoining neighbourhood in Saanich, British Columbia, named for William Fraser Tolmie
Tolmie Channel, a reach of the Inside Passage in British Columbia along the east side of Princess Royal Island, named for William Fraser Tolmie
Tolmie Point, a point on Princess Royal Island west of the northern tip of Sarah Island, named for William Fraser Tolmie

United States
Tolmie Peak, a mountain in Mount Rainier National Park, Washington named for William Fraser Tolmie
Tolmie State Park, near Olympia, Washington